Micropterus is a genus of North American freshwater fish collectively known as the black bass, belonging to the sunfish family Centrarchidae of order Perciformes.  They are sometimes erroneously called "black trout", but the name trout more correctly refers to certain members of the salmonid family.

The black bass are widely distributed east of the Rocky Mountains, from the Hudson Bay basin in Canada to northeastern Mexico. Several species, notably the largemouth and smallmouth bass, have been very widely introduced throughout the world, and are now considered cosmopolitan. All black bass species are highly sought-after game fish and well known as strong fighters when hooked, and bass fishing is an extremely popular outdoor sport throughout their native range.  Their meat is eaten, being quite edible and firm, although they are not regarded as commercial food fish.

All Micropterus species have a dull-green base coloring with dark patterns on the sides. In spawning seasons, the male builds a "bed" (nest) in which a female is induced to deposit her eggs, then he externally fertilizes them. The male continues to guard the eggs and fry until they disperse from the nest.

Various species have been introduced into freshwater bodies in Japan, where they have been declared nuisance fish, and subjected to numerous attempts at eradicating them from local ecosystems.

Species
Currently, 13 recognized species are placed in this genus:

 Micropterus cahabae W. H. Baker, Blanton & C. E. Johnston, 2013 (Cahaba bass) 
 Micropterus cataractae J. D. Williams & G. H. Burgess, 1999 (shoal bass)
 Micropterus chattahoochae W. H. Baker, Blanton & C. E. Johnston, 2013 (Chattahoochee bass) 
 Micropterus coosae C. L. Hubbs & R. M. Bailey, 1940 (redeye bass)
 Micropterus dolomieu Lacépède, 1802 (smallmouth bass) 
 Micropterus floridanus (Lesueur, 1822) (Florida bass)	
 Micropterus henshalli C. L. Hubbs & R. M. Bailey, 1940 (Alabama bass)
 Micropterus notius R. M. Bailey & C. L. Hubbs, 1949 (Suwannee bass) 
 Micropterus punctulatus Rafinesque, 1819 (spotted bass)
 Micropterus salmoides Lacépède, 1802 (largemouth bass) 
 Micropterus tallapoosae W. H. Baker, Blanton & C. E. Johnston, 2013 (Tallapoosa bass) 
 Micropterus treculii (Vaillant & Bocourt, 1874) (Guadalupe bass)
 Micropterus warriorensis W. H. Baker, Blanton & C. E. Johnston, 2013 (warrior bass) 

A 14th species, the Choctaw bass Micropterus haiaka,  has been proposed, but this does not yet appear to have been widely accepted. A further two species, the Altamaha bass and Bartram's bass, are as yet undescribed and have been included under the redeye bass.

A genomic analysis in 2022 described new species and found that the binomials, M. salmoides and M. floridanus as used above are misapplied to the largemouth bass and the Florida bass, this study found that M. salmoides is the valid binomial for the Florida bass, while M. floridanus, is its junior synonym. They also found that the oldest available binomial for the largemouth bass is M. nigricans.

See also
 Bass fishing

References

 
Lepominae
Ray-finned fish genera
Freshwater fish genera
Symbols of Mississippi

Extant Miocene first appearances
Taxa named by Bernard Germain de Lacépède